Events in the year 1920 in Spain.

Incumbents
Monarch: Alfonso XIII
President of the Council of Ministers: Manuel Allendesalazar y Muñoz de Salazar (until 5 May), Eduardo Dato (starting 5 May)

Deaths

January 4 - Benito Pérez Galdós, author (b. 1843)
Raimundo de Madrazo y Garreta, painter (b. 1841)

References

 
Years of the 20th century in Spain
1920s in Spain
Spain
Spain